Russell Reynolds Associates (RRA) is a management consulting firm. Established in 1969, the firm assists international and domestic companies develop leaders, assess business processes, and recruit new executives. It provides leadership advisory and executive recruiting services.

Leadership advisory services include CEO/board advisory, culture assessment, digital transformation, diversity and inclusion, executive search, family business advisory, global supply chain, and leadership assessment services. 

The firm also provides C-Suite recruitment services for positions like board of directors and chief executive officers, corporate affairs officers, digital leadership, financial officers, general counsel and legal officers, human resources officers, marketing officers, risk and compliance officers, supply chain officers, and technology officers.

Russell Reynolds Associates serves clients in different industries such as business and professional services, consumer, education, energy and natural resources, financial services, healthcare, industrial, nonprofit, private equity, and technology industries globally.

In June 2016, Houston Mayor Sylvester Turner retained Russell Reynolds Associates to help find the city’s next police and fire chiefs. In November, the Mayor named Art Acevedo to be Houston's first Latino chief of police. Also named was Fire Chief Samuel Peña, the city's second Latino fire chief.

In April 2017, Fairfield University retained RRA to find a new president when Rev. Jeffrey Von Arx, who held the position for 12 years, announced his reassignment.

In April 2017, Austin City Council retained Russell Reynolds Associates to work with a task force to find a new city manager.

In June 2017, the firm was retained by battery maker Energizer Holdings to identify a permanent CFO.

In December 2018, the firm was retained by Kent State University to identify a new president for the university.

References

External links 
 RussellReynolds.com

Executive search firms
Companies based in New York (state)